The White Stripes were an American alternative rock band from Detroit, Michigan. The band was formed in 1997 and consists of vocalist, multi-instrumentalist, and songwriter Jack White and drummer Meg White, who also occasionally provides vocals. The duo released their first two albums, The White Stripes (1999) and De Stijl (2000), to limited success; it was their third album, White Blood Cells (2001), that pushed the band into the public eye. The album's success was boosted by the single "Fell in Love with a Girl" and its subsequent music video, which won three awards at the 2002 MTV Video Music Awards.

White Blood Cells was followed by Elephant (2003), which earned the band four Grammy Award nominations, and won them the Best Alternative Music Album and Best Rock Song awards. Elephant produced four singles and went double platinum in the United Kingdom. The White Stripes' later albums, Get Behind Me Satan (2005) and Icky Thump (2007), both won the Grammy Award for Best Alternative Music Album and charted in the top five of the Billboard 200. Overall, The White Stripes have won 19 awards from 54 nominations.

American Music Awards
The American Music Awards are awarded for achievements in the record industry. The White Stripes have one nomination.

|-
|  ||rowspan="1"| The White Stripes || Favorite Alternative Artist || 
|-

Billboard Music Awards
The Billboard Music Awards honor artists for commercial performance in the U.S., based on record charts published by Billboard. The awards are based on sales data by Nielsen SoundScan and radio information by Nielsen Broadcast Data Systems. The award ceremony was held from 1990 to 2007, until its reintroduction in 2011.

|-
| rowspan="2" | 2003
| rowspan="2" | "Seven Nation Army"
| Top Rock Song 
| 
|-
| Modern Rock Track of the Year 
|

Brit Awards
The Brit Awards are the British Phonographic Industry's annual pop music awards. The White Stripes have won one awards.

|-
| rowspan="2" | 2003 || rowspan="2" | The White Stripes || International Breakthrough Act || 
|-
| International Group || 
|-
| rowspan="2" | 2004 || Elephant || International Album || 
|-
| rowspan="3" | The White Stripes || rowspan="3" | International Group || 
|-
| 2006 || 
|-
| 2008 ||

Grammy Awards
The Grammy Award are awarded annually by the National Academy of Recording Arts and Sciences. The White Stripes have won six awards from eleven nominations.

|-
|align="center" rowspan=4| 2004
|rowspan="2"| Elephant
| Best Alternative Music Album
| 
|-
| Album of the Year
| 
|-
|rowspan="2"| "Seven Nation Army"
| Best Rock Performance by a Duo or Group with Vocal
| 
|-
| Best Rock Song
| 
|-
|align="center" rowspan=2| 2006 
| Get Behind Me Satan
| Best Alternative Music Album
| 
|-
| "My Doorbell"
| Best Pop Performance by a Duo or Group with Vocals
| 
|-
|align="center" rowspan="3"| 2008
| Icky Thump
| Best Alternative Music Album
| 
|-
|rowspan=2| "Icky Thump"
| Best Rock Performance by a Duo or Group with Vocal
| 
|-
| Best Rock Song
| 
|-
|align="center" rowspan=5| 2011
|rowspan=2| Under Great White Northern Lights
| Best Boxed or Special Limited Edition Package
| 
|-
| Best Music Film
| 
|}

International Dance Music Awards

The International Dance Music Award was established in 1985. It is a part of the Winter Music Conference, a weeklong electronic music event held annually.

 
|-
| 2004
| "Seven Nation Army"
| Best Alternative / Rock Dance Track
|

Meteor Music Awards
The Meteor Music Awards are distributed by MCD Productions and are the national music awards of Ireland. The White Stripes have won one award from two nominations.

|-
|rowspan=2| 2004 || Elephant || Best International Album || 
|-
| The White Stripes || Best International Group || 
|-
| 2006 || The White Stripes || Best International Group || 
|-

MTV Awards
MTV Video Music Awards
The MTV Video Music Awards were established in 1984 by MTV to celebrate the music videos of the year. The White Stripes have won five awards from eighteen nominations.

|-
| rowspan="4" | 2002
| rowspan="4" | "Fell in Love with a Girl"
| Video of the Year
| 
|-
| Breakthrough Video
| 
|-
| Best Special Effects in a Video (Special Effects: Twisted Labs and Sebastian Fau)
| 
|-
| Best Editing in a Video (Editors: Mikros and Duran)
| 
|-
|rowspan="4"| 2003
|rowspan="4"| "Seven Nation Army"
| Best Group Video
| 
|-
| Best Rock Video
| 
|-
| Best Special Effects in a Video (Special Effects: BUF)
| 
|-
| Best Editing in a Video (Editor: Olivier Gajan)
| 
|-
|rowspan="4"| 2004
|rowspan="4"| "The Hardest Button to Button"
| Breakthrough Video
| 
|-
| Best Direction in a Video (Director: Michel Gondry)
| 
|-
| Best Special Effects in a Video (Special Effects: Richard de Carteret, Angus Kneale and Dirk Greene)
| 
|-
| Best Editing in a Video (Editors: Charlie Johnston, Geoff Hounsell and Andy Grieve)
| 
|-
|rowspan="3"| 2005
|rowspan="3"| "Blue Orchid"
| Best Direction in a Video (Director: Floria Sigismondi)
| 
|-
| Best Art Direction in a Video (Art Director: Sue Tebbutt)
| 
|-
| Best Cinematography in a Video (Cinematographer: Chris Soos)
| 
|-
| 2007
| The White Stripes
| Best Group
| 
|-
|rowspan="2"| 2008
|rowspan="2"| "Conquest"
| Best Art Direction (Art Director: David Fitzpatrick)
| 
|-
| Best Cinematography (Cinematographer: Wyatt Troll)
| 
|}

MTV Europe Music Awards
The MTV Europe Music Awards is an annual awards ceremony established in 1994 by MTV Europe. The White Stripes have won one award from eight nominations.

|-
| 2002 || "Fell in Love with a Girl" || Best Video || 
|-
|rowspan="4"| 2003 ||rowspan="2"| The White Stripes || Best Rock || 
|-
| Best Group || 
|-
| Elephant || Best Album || 
|-
| "Seven Nation Army" || Best Video || 
|-
| 2004 || "Hardest Button To Button" || Best Video || 
|-
| 2005 || The White Stripes || Best Alternative || 
|-
| 2007 || The White Stripes || Artist's Choice || 
|-

NME
Founded by the music magazine NME, the Shockwaves NME Awards are awarded annually. The NME Awards USA were introduced in 2008 as an annual alternative for American audiences. The White Stripes have won one award from nine nominations.

Shockwaves NME Awards

|-
|rowspan="2"| 2002 ||rowspan="2"| The White Stripes || Best Band || 
|-
| Best New Act || 
|-
|rowspan="4"| 2004 || "Seven Nation Army" || Best Single || 
|-
| The White Stripes || Best International Band || 
|-
| Elephant || Best Album || 
|-
| "Hardest Button To Button" || Best Video || 
|-

NME Awards USA

|-
|rowspan="3"| 2008 || The White Stripes || Indie/Alternative Band of the Year || 
|-
| Icky Thump || Indie/Alternative Album of the Year || 
|-
| "Icky Thump" || Indie/Alternative Track || 
|-

References

External links
 The White Stripes official website

Awards
White Stripes